John Snell (fl. 1430) was a Canon of Windsor from 1425 to 1431 and Archdeacon of London from 1422 to 1431.

Career
He was appointed:
Rector of St John the Baptist upon Walbrook 1416–1422
King's Almoner 1421
Prebendary of Wildland in St Paul's Cathedral 1426–1431

He was appointed to the fifth stall in St George's Chapel, Windsor Castle in 1426, a position he held until 1431.

Notes

Canons of Windsor
Archdeacons of London